The 1930–31 Yorkshire Cup was the twenty-third occasion on which the Yorkshire Cup competition had been held. Leeds won the trophy by beating Huddersfield in the final by the score of 10–2. This was Leeds' second of six victories in a period of ten years, during which time they won every Yorkshire Cup final in which they appeared.

Background 
The Rugby Football League's Yorkshire Cup competition was a knock-out competition between (mainly professional) rugby league clubs from  the  county of Yorkshire. The actual area was at times increased to encompass other teams from  outside the  county such as Newcastle, Mansfield, Coventry, and even London (in the form of Acton & Willesden.

The Rugby League season always (until the onset of "Summer Rugby" in 1996) ran from around August-time through to around May-time and this competition always took place early in the season, in the Autumn, with the final taking place in (or just before) December (The only exception to this was when disruption of the fixture list was caused during, and immediately after, the two World Wars)

Competition and results  
This season there were no junior/amateur clubs taking part, no new entrants and no "leavers" and so the total of entries remained the  same at fifteen. This in turn resulted in one bye in the first round.

Round 1 
Involved  7 matches (with one bye) and 15 clubs

Round 1 - replays  
Involved  2 matches and 4 clubs

Round 2 - quarter finals 
Involved 4 matches and 8 clubs

Round 2 - replays  
Involved  1 match and 2 clubs

Round 3 – semi-finals  
Involved 2 matches and 4 clubs

Final 
The final was played at Thrum Hall, Halifax, now in West Yorkshire. The attendance was 17,812 and receipts were £1,405.

Teams and scorers 

Scoring - Try = three (3) points - Goal = two (2) points - Drop goal = two (2) points

The road to success

Notes  
1 * Thrum Hall was the home ground of Halifax with a final capacity of 9,832 (The attendance record of 29,153 was set on 21 March 1959 for a third round Challenge Cup tie v  Wigan). The club finally moved out in 1998 to take part ownership and ground-share with Halifax Town FC at The Shay Stadium.

See also 
1930–31 Northern Rugby Football League season
Rugby league county cups

References

External links
Saints Heritage Society
1896–97 Northern Rugby Football Union season at wigan.rlfans.com
Hull&Proud Fixtures & Results 1896/1897
Widnes Vikings - One team, one passion Season In Review - 1896-97
The Northern Union at warringtonwolves.org

RFL Yorkshire Cup
Yorkshire Cup